The election of the President of the Senate of the Republic who would serve trough the Legislature XIX of Italy took place on 13 October 2022, over three weeks after the 2022 Italian general election. It resulted in Ignazio La Russa being elected President.

Procedure 
The election takes place by secret ballot, as required by the assembly's standing orders. Pursuant to the current rules of procedure, an absolute majority of the whole membership is needed to win on the first ballot. On the second and third ballot, a simple majority of ballots cast (including blank ballots in the totals) suffices. If the first three ballots fail to deliver a winner, a runoff is held between the two candidates who got the most votes on the third ballot.

History 
The election took place on 13 October 2022, over three weeks after the 2022 Italian general election. It took place by secret ballot, as required by the assembly's standing orders. Liliana Segre, being the oldest Senator present, served as the acting presiding officer. 

Ignazio La Russa was the official candidate for the Presidency of the Senate of the centre-right coalition (composed of Brothers of Italy, Lega Salvini Premier, Forza Italia and Us Moderates), which at the time of the election held 115 Senate seats, or 11 more than a majority.

Parties who did not belong to the centre-right coalition instructed their members to cast a blank ballot.

Despite the fact 16 Forza Italia Senators refused to vote for La Russa and did not cast a ballot, he nonetheless was elected President on the first ballot with 116 votes, due to support from some members of opposition parties.

Results

See also 

 2022 President of the Italian Chamber of Deputies election

Notes

References 

2022 elections in Italy
October 2022 events in Italy
President of the Italian Senate elections